Symphyotrichum anticostense (formerly Aster anticostensis) is a species of flowering plant in the family Asteraceae endemic to Quebec, New Brunswick, and Maine. Commonly known as Anticosti aster, it is a perennial, herbaceous plant that may reach  in height. Its flowers have pale purple or lilac, sometimes white, ray florets and yellow, then reddish purple, disk florets.

Citations

References

anticostense
Flora of Maine
Flora of New Brunswick
Flora of Quebec
Plants described in 1915
Taxa named by Merritt Lyndon Fernald